William Talvas may refer to three Franco-Norman magnates: 

 William I Talvas (c. 995–after 1030), seigneur of Alençon
 William III of Ponthieu (c. 1095–1172), aka William II Talvas, son of Robert II of Bellême and Agnes of Ponthieu
 William IV of Ponthieu  (1179 – 1221), William III Talvas, Count of Ponthieu and William IV of the house of Belleme/Montgomery